The Democrat Party was a social democrat political party in Qajari Persia, during the constitutional period. It was one of two major parliamentary parties at the time, along with the Moderate Socialists Party. It was largely composed of middle-class intellectuals and stood for the separation of church and state.

History 
Initially an offshoot of the Transcaucasia-based Social Democratic Party, it severed direct ties with Baku and dropped "Social" from the name in deference to the conservative public. Its ideology, however, remained heavily borrowed from the old party.

In 1918, the party split definitively into the Pro-Reorganization Democrats led by Bahar; and the Anti-Reorganization Democrats.

Parliament election results

References

1909 establishments in Iran
1919 disestablishments in Iran
Anti-clerical parties
Defunct nationalist parties
Defunct social democratic parties
Defunct socialist parties in Iran
Iranian nationalism
Radical parties
Liberal parties in Iran
Nationalist parties in Iran
Political parties disestablished in 1919
Political parties established in 1909
Political parties in Qajar Iran
Progressive parties
Secularism in Iran
Social democratic parties in Asia